Ivanhoe's Restaurant is located in Upland, Indiana near the campus of Taylor University.

Founded in 1965, the restaurant has been a hangout for generations of students and has been featured in travel magazines as well as statewide and local newspaper articles.

Ivanhoe's is known for its selection of 100 different sundaes and shakes, and the menu also includes hamburgers, salads, pork tenderloins, and hot dogs.

See also
 List of drive-in restaurants

References and notes

External links
 Ivanhoe's web site

Tourist attractions in Grant County, Indiana
Restaurants in Indiana
Drive-in restaurants
Restaurants established in 1965
Buildings and structures in Grant County, Indiana
1965 establishments in Indiana

ar:قالب:بذرة مطعم